Wheat germ oil is extracted from the germ of the wheat kernel, which makes up only 2.5% by weight of the kernel Wheat germ oil is particularly high in octacosanol - a 28-carbon long-chain saturated primary alcohol found in a number of different vegetable waxes. Octacosanol has been studied as an exercise- and physical performance-enhancing agent.  Very long chain fatty alcohols obtained from plant waxes and beeswax have been reported to lower plasma cholesterol in humans. Wheat germ oil is also very high in vitamin E (255 mg/100g), and has the highest content of vitamin E of any food that has not undergone prior preparation or vitamin fortification. As a cooking oil, wheat germ oil is strongly flavored, expensive and easily perishable. Wheat germ oil contains the following fatty acids:

{| class="wikitable"
! Component !! g/100g
|-
| Linoleic acid (omega-6)|| align="right" | 55
|-
| Palmitic acid || align="right" | 16
|-
| Oleic acid || align="right" | 14
|-
| Linolenic acid (omega-3) || align="right" | 7
|}

Other uses of wheat germ oil have also been explored, including increasing blood flow and reaction time.

See also 
 Rice bran oil

References

Vegetable oils
Wheat

de:Weizen#Weizenkeimöl